Somerset High School is a public high school located in Somerset, Texas, southwest of San Antonio, Texas. It is the sole high school in the Somerset Independent School District and is classified as a 5A school by the UIL. In 2015, the school was rated "Met Standard" by the Texas Education Agency.

Athletics
The Somerset Bulldogs compete in the following sports:

Baseball
Basketball
Cross Country
Football
Golf
Powerlifting
Soccer
Softball
Tennis
Track and Field
Volleyball

References

External links
 Official website
 Somerset ISD Twitter

Public high schools in Bexar County, Texas